Jaana Marjatta Kapari-Jatta (born 19 May 1955, in Turku) is a Finnish translator of fiction, best known for her Finnish-language renderings of the Harry Potter novels and supplementary books by J. K. Rowling, including Harry Potter and the Cursed Child. In her translations of Fantastic Beasts and Where to Find Them and Quidditch Through the Ages, she used the pseudonym “Kurvaa Aka (Whoss Gue)”.

Ms. Kapari-Jatta has also translated several other English-language authors, like Edgar Allan Poe, Oscar Wilde, and Roald Dahl, into Finnish. Among the awards she has received are the Astrid Lindgren Prize of the International Federation of Translators in 2002 and the Finnish State Prize for Children's Culture in 2007.  In 2014 she received the J. A. Hollo Prize for her translation of Virginia Woolf’s book The Death of the Moth and Other Essays. In 2022, she received a honoris causa doctorate from the Faculty of Philosophy at the University of Helsinki.

In 2008, she published a fact book, Pollomuhku ja Posityyhtynen, where she discusses translating the Harry Potter novels.

Ms. Kapari-Jatta is married and has three children and also grandchildren. She resides in Loviisa, Finland, and in Serekunda, Gambia.


Translated books

Harry Potter books by J. K. Rowling
 Harry Potter and the Philosopher's Stone
 Harry Potter and the Chamber of Secrets
 Harry Potter and the Prisoner of Azkaban
 Harry Potter and the Goblet of Fire
 Harry Potter and the Order of the Phoenix
 Harry Potter and the Half-Blood Prince
 Harry Potter and the Deathly Hallows
 Fantastic Beasts and Where to Find Them
 Quidditch Through the Ages
 The Tales of Beedle the Bard
 Harry Potter and the Cursed Child
 Fantastic Beasts and Where to Find Them: The Original Screenplay

Other books (selection)
 The Wonderful Story of Henry Sugar and Six More by Roald Dahl
 Nancy Drew series by Carolyn Keene
 Collected Stories by Edgar Allan Poe
 Ottoline and the Yellow Cat by Chris Riddell
 Holes by Louis Sachar
 Diana: The Last Year by Donald Spoto
 Mr Gum series by Andy Stanton
 Mary Poppins by P. L. Travers
 The Happy Prince and Other Stories by Oscar Wilde

References

1955 births
Finnish translators
Translators to Finnish
Harry Potter in translation
People from Turku
Translators from English
Living people
Finnish expatriates in the Gambia
20th-century translators
21st-century translators